Big Bend is an unincorporated community in Avoyelles Parish, Louisiana, United States.

Etymology
Big Bend was named from its location on a meander of the Bayou Des Glaises.

References

Unincorporated communities in Avoyelles Parish, Louisiana
Unincorporated communities in Louisiana